Adam's needle is a common name for several plants in the genus Yucca and may refer to:

Yucca filamentosa, native to the southeastern United States
Yucca flaccida
Yucca gloriosa, native to the southeastern United States

See also
Spanish bayonet''